Edwin Francis Jemison (December 1, 1844 – July 1, 1862) was a Confederate soldier who served in Company C, 2nd Louisiana Infantry, from May 1861 until he was killed at the Battle of Malvern Hill.

Jemison's photograph has become one of the most famous and iconic portraits of the young soldiers of both the Confederate and Union armies. It was featured particularly on the cover of the American Russian-language magazine Amerika in 1991.

American Civil War
Jemison enlisted on May 11, 1861, and was among the war's early volunteers. He participated in the Peninsula Campaign under Maj. Gen. Magruder.

Death
Jemison was killed on July 1, 1862, at the Battle of Malvern Hill. The circumstances of his death will likely never be fully known, though a popular story emerged of a direct hit from a cannonball which decapitated him. The cause of his death has since been called into question. The death by cannon fire story was corroborated by the 1887 obituary of his younger brother, Sam, but incorrectly identifies the battle as First Manassas.  Biographer Alexandra Filipowski debunks the tale altogether. A veteran named Captain Moseley told the gruesome story of the decapitation to crowds all over the south, often for money. At one such event, Jemison's brother was in attendance and drew his own conclusion, stating “that was my brother.” It has since been shown, however, that Moseley did not fight at Malvern Hill and could not have witnessed Private Jemison's demise. Filipowski cites Jemison's obituary as the only actual known account of his death: “He sustain[ed] himself in the front rank of the soldier and gentlemen until the moment of his death. Bounding forward at the order ‘Charge!’ he was stricken down in the front rank, and without a struggle yielded up his young life.”  Following the Battle of Malvern Hill, both sides buried their dead on the battlefield. After the American Civil War, organizations like the United Daughters of the Confederacy returned to the old battlefields and disinterred the bodies of fallen Confederate soldiers and gave them proper burials in places like the Confederate Section of Hollywood Cemetery in nearby Richmond, Virginia. It is thought that Jemison's parents erected the monument to him at Memory Hill Cemetery in Milledgeville, Georgia, where he may be buried. Most believe that he was buried on or near the Malvern Hill battlefield in Henrico County, Virginia, in an unmarked grave.

See also
Johnny Reb
List of iconic photographs

References

External links

 
 NPS Soldier Database entry
 Private Edwin Jemison: The Boy Soldier

1844 births
1862 deaths
Burials in the United States
Confederate States Army soldiers
Confederate States of America military personnel killed in the American Civil War
People from Milledgeville, Georgia
People notable for being the subject of a specific photograph
People of Georgia (U.S. state) in the American Civil War
Child soldiers in the American Civil War
Photographs of children in war